Pérès is a French surname derived from Gascon language

Etymology
From Gascon language péré and mostly its plural form pérès, meaning pear trees.

Surname
People with the surname Pérès include:
 Jean-Baptiste Pérès, French physicist
 Joseph Pérès, French mathematician
 Gil-Pérès, real name Jules-Charles Pérès Jolin, French stage actor and vaudevilliste
 Marcel Pérès, French musicologist, composer, choral director and singer
 Marcel Pérès (actor), French actor

See also 
 Peres

Notes and references

Occitan-language surnames